Baycomms Broadcasting Corporation is a Philippine broadcast media company. It was a radio network which operated a number of stations across regional areas in the Philippines under the Bay Radio branding. It currently serves as the licensee for majority of the stations owned by Brigada Mass Media Corporation after the latter's acquisition in 2013.

The network never had a Bay Radio station in Metro Manila, Cebu and Davao during its existence.

History
Baycomms Broadcasting Corporation was founded in 1992 by Ernesto Yabut, with DWTY 93.5 in Olongapo City & DXBY 89.9 in Zamboanga City.

Financial struggles would later hound the network as within the late 2000s, a number of Bay Radio stations were either sold to other networks or continue with operation cuts. Among those were DXRK Cagayan de Oro, which was sold to Hypersonic Broadcasting Center in 2011 & became Magnum Radio 99.9, and DXYM General Santos, which became the nucleus of Brigada News FM in 2009.

In February 2013, Baycomms was acquired by Brigada Mass Media Corporation. Soon, its stations started carrying the brand Brigada News FM.

References

Philippine radio networks
Radio stations in the Philippines
Mass media companies of the Philippines
Mass media companies established in 1992
Mass media companies disestablished in 2013
Companies based in Olongapo
Philippine companies established in 1992
2013 disestablishments in the Philippines